Arthrochilus sabulosus, commonly known as the spotted elbow orchid, is a flowering plant in the orchid family (Orchidaceae) and is endemic to Tropical North Queensland and Horn Island. It has a rosette of dull green leaves on side growth at its base and up to fifteen pale green, insect-like flowers with reddish to brownish glands on its labellum.

Description
Arthrochilus sabulosus is a terrestrial, perennial, deciduous, sympodial herb with an underground tuber that produces daughter tubers on the end of root-like stolons. The lateral sepals and petals are turned back against the ovary. Flowering occurs from November to July.

Taxonomy and naming
Arthrochilus sabulosus was first formally described in 1991 by David Jones from a specimen collected on Horn Island. The description was published in Australian Orchid Research. The specific epithet (sabulosus) is a Latin word meaning "full of sand" or "sandy", referring to the sandy places where this orchid tends to grow.

Distribution and habitat
The spotted elbow orchid grows in sand dunes with scrub vegetation. It is found on the northern part of the Cape York Peninsula and on Horn Island in the Torres Strait.

Ecology
As with other Arthrochilus orchids, A. sabulosus is pollinated by male thynnid wasps of the genus Arthrothynnus although the species involved is not known. It also reproduces asexually by producing new tubers.

References 

sabulosus
Plants described in 1991
Orchids of Queensland